Scoop Smith is a fictional character first appeared in Fawcett Comics' Whiz Comics #2 (Feb 1940). The character was created by Bill Parker and Greg Duncan.

Scoop is a crime-fighting news reporter, assisted by cameraman Blimp Black. According to Jess Nevins' Encyclopedia of Golden Age Superheroes, "he goes after mad scientists (Dr. Death), tracks down the explorer who discovered the Fountain of Youth, tracks down the Lost City of Scorpia, and goes after the Emperor of the Bahamas".

References

External links
Scoop Smith at the Marvel Family web

Golden Age adventure heroes
Comics characters introduced in 1940
Fawcett Comics superheroes
Characters created by Bill Parker (comics)
Fictional reporters